George Ratkovicz (November 13, 1922 – November 10, 2008) was an American basketball player who played for five seasons in the National Basketball League and for six seasons in the National Basketball Association.  He played center and forward during his career.

National Basketball League
Ratkovicz's pro career began when he was 19 years old, playing 13 games for the Chicago Bruins of the National Basketball League during the 1941–1942 season.  Ratkovicz missed the next three seasons due to military service, then returned to Chicago in time for the 1945–1946 season, this time playing for the Chicago American Gears.  He spent two seasons with the Gears, then went on to play for the NBL's Rochester Royals and Tri-Cities Blackhawks for one season apiece.

Syracuse Nationals
When the NBL merged with the Basketball Association of America and formed the National Basketball Association, Ratkovicz joined the Syracuse Nationals for the 1949–1950 season.  Playing alongside future Basketball Hall of Famers Dolph Schayes and Al Cervi, Ratkovicz averaged eight and a half points per game in his first NBA season and played in the NBA Finals, where the Nationals lost to the Minneapolis Lakers in six games.

Statistically, Ratkovicz's best season came the following year during the 1950–1951 season.  Playing in all 66 of the Nationals' team games, he averaged thirteen points and over eight rebounds per game.  His 41.5% field goal percentage was the sixth highest in the NBA that season, and he also ranked in the top ten in free throws and free throw attempts.

Ratkovicz's role was reduced during the 1951–1952 season; playing in twenty and a half minutes a game, he averaged seven and a half points and five rebounds per game while serving as a backup to Dolph Schayes.

Milwaukee Hawks
For the 1952–1953 season, Ratkovicz joined the Milwaukee Hawks.  His playing time increased with the Hawks, and he averaged over thirty minutes a game in his first year with the Hawks.  That season, he averaged nine-and-a-half points and nearly seven-and-a-half rebounds per game.  He recorded similar numbers during the 1953–1954 season.  During the 1954–1955 season, his final year in the NBA, he played in just nine games.  He retired with over 3,000 points and nearly 2,000 rebounds in his career.

Death
Ratkovicz died in Webster, New York on November 10, 2008, at the age of eighty-five.

References

1922 births
2008 deaths
American men's basketball players
American people of Slavic descent
Baltimore Bullets (1944–1954) players
Basketball players from Chicago
Centers (basketball)
Chicago American Gears players
Chicago Bruins players
Milwaukee Hawks players
Power forwards (basketball)
Professional Basketball League of America players
Rochester Royals players
Syracuse Nationals players
Tri-Cities Blackhawks players
Robert Lindblom Math & Science Academy alumni